Quality Food Centers, better known as QFC, is an American supermarket chain based in Bellevue, Washington, east of Seattle. Its 62 stores are in western Washington and northwestern Oregon, located in the Puget Sound region and Portland metropolitan area. QFC is a subsidiary of Kroger.

History

Jack Croco began his career in the grocery business in the 1940s in Boise, Idaho, working for Albertsons. By 1950, he had become the district manager in the Northwest and was responsible for opening the first Albertson's stores in the Seattle area. Soon afterward in 1955, Croco opened his own grocery store in Bellevue, called Lake Hills Thriftway.

The grocery concern that would come to be named QFC in 1963 was founded in 1955 with the first store at 6600 Roosevelt Way N.E. in Seattle by a group headed by Vern Fortin, the former president of Van de Kamp's Holland Dutch Bakeries and founder of Vernell's Fine Candies. Croco merged his store with QFC in 1960, and remained involved in the company until his death in 1991 at the age of 65, though in 1986 he sold QFC to Seattle investment firm Sloan, Adkins & Co., which took QFC public in 1987.

Christopher A. Sinclair became the CEO in 1996; the following year, QFC purchased the Uddenberg grocery company, which operated Thriftway and Stock Market stores throughout western Washington. In late 1997, QFC was sold to Portland-based Fred Meyer, and several months later in May 1998, Kroger announced its intention to acquire Fred Meyer (and QFC), which was approved a year later. The Roosevelt store operated until 2012; it closed on May 5 to make way for construction of the Roosevelt light rail station.

Expansion
Over the years, QFC has expanded aggressively through acquisitions. When A&P abandoned the Seattle area in 1974, QFC took over several locations. They expanded to surrounding counties in the 1990s by acquiring and renaming Olson's Food Stores, Johnny's Food Centers, Stock Market Grocery Stores, and several Thriftway stores. Between 1990 and 1996, thirty stores were acquired from eleven independent grocery chains. Reed's Super Valu in Port Hadlock and Stock Market Foods in Port Townsend were acquired in 1997, and the company also expanded into Oregon in the Portland metro area.

In the mid-1990s, QFC expanded to southern California by acquiring Hughes Family Markets (which kept its name). By the mid-1990s, many Hughes store locations were sold to Ralphs, which was soon sold to Fred Meyer, later  acquired by Kroger.

Philanthropy and controversy

In 1996, Stuart Sloan, former owner and chairman of QFC, promised to spend at least $1 million a year for the next eight years to overhaul one of Seattle Public Schools's most challenged schools, T.T. Minor Elementary. The funds were donated in addition to public dollars and helped to pay for uniforms, smaller class sizes and a year-round schedule, though the manner in which the funds were applied sparked controversy.

References

External links
QFC homepage
The Kroger Company

Kroger
1955 establishments in Washington (state)
Companies based in Bellevue, Washington
Retail companies established in 1955
Economy of the Northwestern United States
Supermarkets of the United States
1980s initial public offerings
1997 mergers and acquisitions
American companies established in 1955